Crepidoma is an architectural term for part of the structure of  ancient Greek buildings. The crepidoma is the multilevel platform on which the superstructure of the building is erected. The crepidoma usually has three levels. Each level typically decreases in size incrementally going upwards, forming a series of steps along all or some sides of the building. The crepidoma rests on the euthynteria or foundation, which historically was constructed of locally available stone for the sake of economy.

The topmost level of the crepidoma is called the stylobate, because it is the platform for the columns ( - ). The lower levels of the crepidoma are called the stereobates. The step-like arrangement of the crepidoma may extend around all four sides of a structure like a temple, for example, on the Parthenon. On some temples, the steps extend only across the front façade, or they may wrap around the sides for a short distance, a detail that is called a return, as seen at the Sanctuary of Despoina at Lycosoura. 

It is common for the hidden portions of each level of the stereobate to be of a lower grade of material than the exposed elements of the steps and the stylobate; each higher level of the crepidoma typically covers the clamps used to hold the stones of the lower level together.  The lower margins of each level of the crepidoma blocks are often cut back in a series of two or three steps to create shadow lines; this decorative technique is termed a reveal.

References 
Robertson, D. S. Handbook of Greek and Roman Architecture. Cambridge: Cambridge University Press, 1929.

External links 

Architectural elements
Ancient Greek architecture